is a Japanese anime series. Mock and his sister, Sweet, are curious about the fuss on the earth and eventually decide to come out of the ground. They save the poor, the innocent and the brave whenever and wherever these people need help. Mock and Sweet get rid of tyrants, evil kings and notorious emperors, with smart and funny tricks a la Mole!  The story background follows major historic events.

Characters
Mock/Dorimogu - Toshiko Fujita
Sweet/Hanamogu - Masako Miura

External links
 
  - Enoki Films USA

1986 anime television series debuts
1987 Japanese television series endings
Nippon TV original programming
Fictional moles
Animated television series about mammals
Animated television series about children
Animated television series about siblings